The 2017 K League Challenge was the fifth season of the K League Challenge, the second tier South Korean professional league for association football clubs since its establishment in 2013. The top-ranked team and the winner of the promotion play-offs among three clubs ranked between 2nd and 4th got promoted to the K League 1 after the regular season ended.

Teams
Daegu FC, the second-placed team of the 2016 K League Challenge, and Gangwon FC, the promotion series winner, were promoted to the 2017 K League Classic. Suwon FC and Seongnam FC were relegated from the top tier. A total of 10 teams contested in the league.

Stadiums 
Primary venues used in the K League Challenge:

Personnel and kits

Note: Flags indicate national team as has been defined under FIFA eligibility rules. Players may hold more than one non-FIFA nationality.

Foreign players
Restricting the number of foreign players strictly to four per team, including a slot for a player from AFC countries. A team could use four foreign players on the field each game.

As of 28 July 2017.

League table

Positions by matchday

Round 1-18

Round 19-36

Results

Matches 1–18

Matches 19–36

Promotion-Relegation Playoffs
Promotion and relegation playoffs was held between 2nd~4th clubs of 2017 K League Challenge and 11th club of 2017 K League Classic. If scores are tied after regular time at Semi-Playoff and Playoff, the higher placed team advances to the next phase. The same conditions do not apply to Promotion-Relegation Playoffs.

Semi-Playoff

Playoff

Promotion-Relegation Playoffs

First leg

Second leg

''Sangju Sangmu retained its 2018 K League 1 spot, 5:4 on penalties.

Season statistics

Top scorers

Top assists

Attendance

Awards

Most Valuable Player of The Round

Manager of the Month

Season Awards 
The 2016 K League Awards was held on 20 November 2017.

K League Challenge Most Valuable Player
The K League Challenge Most Valuable Player award was won by  Marcão (Gyeongnam FC).

K League Challenge Top Scorer

The K League Challenge Top Scorer award was won by  Marcão (Gyeongnam FC).

K League Challenge Top Assistor

The K League Challenge Top Assistor award was won by  Chang Hyuk-jin (Ansan Greeners).

K League Challenge Best XI

K League Challenge Manager of the Year
The K League Challenge Manager of the Year award was won by  Kim Jong-boo (Gyeongnam FC).

References

External links
Official K League Website 

K League Challenge seasons
K
K
K